Darien Lakes State Park is a  state park in western Genesee County, New York, near Darien Center. The park entrance is on Harlow Road, north of U.S. Route 20.

Park description
The park has 154 campsites, the majority with electrical hookups, and operates primarily as a campground. This portion of the park is open seasonally and mostly accommodates RV and trailer camping, although tent camping is available as well.

Besides the campground, the park also offers a beach on  Harlow Lake, picnic tables, a playground, recreation programs, a nature trail, hiking and biking, a bridle path, fishing, cross-country skiing and snowmobiling. Seasonal small game and deer hunting is allowed with the proper permit.

See also
 List of New York state parks

References

External links
 New York State Parks: Darien Lakes State Park

State parks of New York (state)
Parks in Genesee County, New York